The canton of Lavaur Cocagne is an administrative division of the Tarn department, southern France. It was created at the French canton reorganisation which came into effect in March 2015. Its seat is in Lavaur.

It consists of the following communes:
 
Aguts
Algans
Bannières
Belcastel
Cambon-lès-Lavaur
Cuq-Toulza
Labastide-Saint-Georges
Lacougotte-Cadoul
Lacroisille
Lavaur
Marzens
Massac-Séran
Maurens-Scopont
Montcabrier
Montgey
Mouzens
Péchaudier
Puéchoursi
Roquevidal
Teulat
Veilhes
Villeneuve-lès-Lavaur
Viviers-lès-Lavaur

References

Cantons of Tarn (department)